Sporthalle may refer to:

Sporthalle Augsburg, an indoor arena in Augsburg, Germany
Sporthalle Gießen-Ost, an indoor arena in Gießen, Germany
Sporthalle (Böblingen) (1966-2008), a former indoor arena in Böblingen, Germany
Sporthalle (Cologne) (1958-1998), a former indoor arena in Cologne, Germany

See also
Alsterdorfer Sporthalle (Sporthalle Hamburg), an indoor arena in Hamburg, Germany
Knick-Ei (Sporthalle Feldstraße), a former sports hall in Halstenbek, Germany
TipsArena Linz (Linzer Sporthalle), an indoor arena in Linz, Austria
RWE-Sporthalle, a sports hall in Mülheim, Germany